Adickes may refer to:

People
 David Adickes (born 1927), American sculptor
 Erich Adickes (1866–1928), German philosopher
 Mark Adickes (born 1961), American footballer and physician

Other uses
 Adickes v. S. H. Kress & Co., a United States Supreme Court case